Anthony Frederick Charles "Tom" Adams (9 March 1938 – 11 December 2014) was an English actor with roles in adventure, horror and mystery films and several TV shows.  He was best known for his role as Daniel Fogarty in several series of The Onedin Line.

Early life
Adams was born in Poplar, London and his father was a commercial chauffeur. After school he did national service in the Coldstream Guards, then joined the Unity Theatre, London. He adopted the stage name of Tom Adams and taught English and drama at the Cardinal Griffin secondary modern school, Poplar, in the 1960s between acting jobs with repertory companies.

Career
He appeared in television series such as The Avengers, Maigret and Ghost Squad as well as films from 1961 and made his West End debut, supporting Anton Walbrook and Peter Sallis, in Masterpiece at the Royalty in 1961. He joined the Royal Shakespeare Company in 1962 as one of an infusion of new actors into Michael Elliott’s production of As You Like It at the Aldwych Theatre.  His first big screen break was a role as Nimmo in The Great Escape (1963), in which the salary from the film allowed him to buy his first car.

He starred as the lead of a film series featuring a low budget imitation James Bond named Charles Vine in three films beginning with Licensed to Kill (aka The Second Best Secret Agent in the Whole Wide World, 1965) and the sequels Where the Bullets Fly (1966) and Somebody's Stolen Our Russian Spy (aka "O.K. Yevtushenko" 1967) that was shot in Spain.  He was the second male lead in the 1966 Disney film The Fighting Prince of Donegal after he replaced Mark Eden who broke his ankle during the film's shooting and menaced Raquel Welch in Fathom.

Adams' television credits include Emergency – Ward 10 where he played Dr Guy Marshall from 1964 to 1967 and later the similar Dr Guy Wallman in General Hospital between 1975 and 1978; starred as Major Sullivan in the BBC counter-espionage drama Spy Trap from  1973 to 1975, The Onedin Line as Daniel Fogarty (1977–79); Doctor Who as Vorshak in Warriors of the Deep (1984); and Emmerdale Farm (1987) as Malcolm Bates. He took the lead in The Enigma Files in 1980.

During the late 1970s, he appeared in TV commercials for Dixons, and for many years in the 1980s and 1990s he was the face of the furniture store chain DFS/Northern Upholstery. In 2011, he was seen in a series of commercials advertising the Aero Biscuit, and he later appeared in an ad for Stannah Stairlifts and Hyundai. He was noted as a voice-over artist, and became the continuity announcer for UK television channel, E4.

A keen golfer, he authored a 1996 book of short stories Shakespeare Was a Golfer: A Collection of Golfing Shorts.

Death
Adams died on 11 December 2014 at the age of 76 at Wexham Park Hospital in Berkshire, of cancer.

TV and filmography

 A Chance of Thunder (1961, TV series) .... Evans
The Avengers (1961-1969, TV Series) .... PC Butterworth / Rayner / Grenville
A Pair of Briefs (1962) .... Wheelchair attendant (uncredited)
Play It Cool (1962) .... Reporter #2 (uncredited)
A Prize of Arms (1962) .... Corporal Glenn
The Great Escape (1963) .... Dai Nimmo, "Diversions"
This Is My Street (1964) .... Paul
Emergency – Ward 10 (1964, TV Series) .... Mr. Guy Marshall
The Peaches (1964, British short subject) .... The Boy
Z-Cars (1965, TV Series) .... Steve
R3 (1965,TV Series) .... John Rawlins
Licensed to Kill (1965) .... Charles Vine
The Spies (1966, TV Series) .... Stefan
Where the Bullets Fly (1966) .... Charles Vine
The Fighting Prince of Donegal (1966) .... Henry O'Neill
Fathom (1967) .... Mike
Subterfuge (1968) .... Peter Langley
O.K. Yevtushenko (1968) .... Charles Vine
Journey to Midnight (1968) .... Jerry Crown (segment "The Indian Spirit Guide")
Strange Report (1969, TV Series) .... Clinton
UFO (1970, Episode: "The Psychobombs") .... Captain Lauritzen
The House That Dripped Blood (1970) .... Richard / Dominic (segment 1 "Method for Murder")
Von Richthofen and Brown aka The Red Baron (1971) .... Owen
The Persuaders! , ('The Time and the Place', episode) (1971, TV Series) .... Piers Emerson
The Fast Kill (1972) .... Max Stein
The Daredevil Men (1972, British short subject) .... Unidentified leading man
Dixon of Dock Green (1972-1976, TV Series) .... Charlie Mann / Johnny Orwell / Jack Montelbetti
Madigan (1972–1973, TV Series) .... Detective Jaqueta
Spy Trap (1973) .... Major Sullivan
General Hospital (1975–1978, TV Series) .... Dr. Guy Wallman
The Onedin Line (1977–1979, TV Series) .... Daniel Fogarty
The Enigma Files (1980, TV Series) .... Det Chief Insp Nick Lewis
Doctor Who (1984, TV Series) .... Commander Vorshak
Remington Steele (1984, TV Series) .... Richard Moreland
Strike It Rich! (1986–1987, TV Series) .... Ken Stevenson
Pyrates (1991) .... Calico Jack (uncredited)
Day of the Sirens (2002) .... Chat Show Host (final film role)

References

External links 

Tom Adams; Aveleyman.com

1938 births
2014 deaths
English male film actors
Male actors from London
Deaths from cancer in England
English male soap opera actors
English male stage actors
Royal Shakespeare Company members
20th-century English male actors
People from Poplar, London
Coldstream Guards soldiers